John Putnam Chapin (April 21, 1810 – June 27, 1864) served as Mayor of Chicago, Illinois (1846–1847) for the Whig Party.

Chapin left his hometown to enter the mercantile business in Haverhill, New Hampshire before moving to Chicago in 1832. In Chicago he became a member of the wholesale and retail merchants firm Wadsworth, Dyer & Chapin until it was dissolved in 1843. Following the dissolution of the firm, Chapin joined the Canal Boat Transportation Company. He was a founding member of the Chicago Board of Trade.

From 1844 to 1845, Chapin served a single term as Chicago alderman from the 1st ward.

In 1846, Chapin ran for mayor of Chicago as a Whig against Democratic nominee Charles Follansbee and Liberty Party nominee Philo Carpenter, winning the office with just over 55% of the vote.

Following his term as Mayor, Chapin was elected to the city council in 1859. In 1861, he was nominated by the Union ticket for the office of Commissioner of Public Works.  As Chapin was a Republican, he declined the nomination as he felt it was a mischievous move on the part of the Democrats.

He died in Chicago on June 27, 1864, and was buried at Graceland Cemetery.

References

1810 births
1864 deaths
Burials at Graceland Cemetery (Chicago)
Mayors of Chicago
People from Bradford, Vermont
Illinois Republicans
19th-century American politicians
Illinois Whigs
Chicago City Council members